The COVID-19 vaccination in the United Arab Emirates is an ongoing mass immunization campaign, in response to the ongoing pandemic. 

In December 2020, the vaccination campaign began after its authorization of emergency use of Sinopharm BIBP COVID-19 vaccine.

The Ministry of Health and Prevention (MOHAP) has approved six COVID-19 vaccines; the following are: Sinopharm BIBP, Pfizer-BioNTech, Sputnik V,  Oxford–AstraZeneca, Moderna, and Sinopharm CNBG.

Background 
COVID-19 is an infectious disease caused by severe acute respiratory syndrome coronavirus 2 (SARS-CoV-2). The first reported case of SARS-CoV-2 was identified in Wuhan, Hubei, China. In January 2020, first cases of COVID-19 was reported in the United Arab Emirates.

Approvals 
The United Arab Emirates has issued an approval of emergency use on the following dates:

 9 December 2020 – Sinopharm BIBP COVID-19 vaccine.
 22 December 2020 – Pfizer-BioNTech COVID-19 vaccine.
 21 January 2021 – Sputnik V COVID-19 vaccine.
 February – Oxford–AstraZeneca COVID-19 vaccine.
 4 July 2021 – Moderna COVID-19 vaccine.
 27 December 2021 – Sinopharm CNBG COVID-19 vaccine.

Progress

References 

Vaccination campaign
United Arab Emirates